Butler House is an inn and restaurant in the Stowe Village Historic District in Vermont, United States. Located at 128 Main Street (Vermont Route 100), at the intersection with School Street, the building dates to 1835. It stands directly opposite Stowe Community Church.

The building was formerly the home of Orion W. Butler (1803–1883), one of Stowe's first attorneys. It has also been a tavern and a post office.

Current owners Paul and Laura Biron purchased the property in 2009. They renovated the building in line with National Historic Trust guidelines. The couple also owned the previous two businesses at the location: a restaurant named Mi Casa, and its predecessor, Frida's Taqueria.

In addition to guest rooms, a restaurant, named Butler's Pantry, serves breakfast. The restaurant won the Most Popular Breakfast award from Insider.com in 2018 and the Best Pancakes in Vermont award from People in 2020.

In the mid-19th century, Butler House was one of several buildings used to determine the height of Mount Washington:

References

External links 

 Official website

Restaurants in Vermont
Hotels in Vermont
Houses completed in 1835
Buildings and structures in Stowe, Vermont